The Berlin Group consist of almost forty banks, associations and PSPs from across the EU. The objective is to define open and common scheme- and processor-independent standards in the inter-banking domain between creditor banks (acquirers) and debtor banks (issuer) and to complement the work carried out by organisations like the European Payments Council. To achieve this objective, the Berlin Group has established a pure technical standardisation body, focusing on detailed technical and organisational requirements. This common API standard is called "NextGenPSD2" and was developed to create uniform and interoperable communications between banks and TPPs.

See also
Payment Services Directive
Open banking

References

Application programming interfaces
Banking in the European Union